New Hope is an unincorporated community in Smith County, Texas, United States. It is part of the Tyler, Texas Metropolitan Statistical Area.

Notes

External links
 NEW HOPE, TX Handbook of Texas Online.

Unincorporated communities in Smith County, Texas
Unincorporated communities in Texas